Sonnet 149 is one of 154 sonnets written by the English playwright and poet William Shakespeare.

It is considered a Dark Lady sonnet, as are all from 127 to 152.

Structure 
Sonnet 149 is an English or Shakespearean sonnet. The English sonnet has three quatrains, followed by a final rhyming couplet. It follows the typical rhyme scheme of the form ABAB CDCD EFEF GG and is composed in iambic pentameter, a type of poetic metre based on five pairs of metrically weak/strong syllabic positions. The 8th line exemplifies a regular iambic pentameter:

 × /    × /   × /    ×     / ×    / 
Revenge upon myself with present moan? (149.8)
/ = ictus, a metrically strong syllabic position. × = nonictus.

The last line begins with a common metrical variant, an initial reversal:

  /     ×   ×   /    ×   /      ×   / ×    / 
Those that can see thou lov'st, and I am blind. (149.14)

Initial reversals are potentially present in lines 3, 4, and 14, and a mid-line reversal is potentially present in line 6.

The meter demands that line 2's "cruel" be pronounced as two syllables, and line 11's "defect" (although a noun) be stressed on the second syllable.

Notes

References

British poems
Sonnets by William Shakespeare